Anatoly Vasilyevich Perov (12 August 1926 – 22 September 2001) was a Russian light-heavyweight boxer. In 1952 he won his only Soviet title, as well as an Olympic bronze medal. He retired in 1955 with a record of 111 wins out of 130 bouts.

References

1926 births
Martial artists from Moscow
Soviet male boxers
Olympic boxers of the Soviet Union
Olympic bronze medalists for the Soviet Union
Boxers at the 1952 Summer Olympics
2001 deaths
Olympic medalists in boxing
Russian male boxers
Medalists at the 1952 Summer Olympics
Light-heavyweight boxers